Ronald Joseph Morel "Ronnie" Turcotte,  (born July 22, 1941) is a retired Canadian thoroughbred race horse jockey best known as the rider of Secretariat, winner of the U.S. Triple Crown in 1973.

Career
Turcotte began his career in Toronto as a hot walker for E. P. Taylor's Windfields Farm in 1960, but he was soon wearing the silks and winning races. As an apprentice jockey he rode Windfields' Northern Dancer to his first victory. He gained prominence with his victory aboard Tom Rolfe in the 1965 Preakness Stakes.

Turcotte soon started working with Canadian trainer Lucien Laurin at the racetrack in Laurel, Maryland.

In 1972 he rode Riva Ridge to victory in the Kentucky Derby and the Belmont Stakes.

Turcotte became internationally famous in 1973 when he rode Secretariat to win the first Triple Crown in 25 years, with records for each race, and the phenomenal finish of Secretariat 31 lengths ahead of the field in the Belmont. A photograph of Secretariat winning the race, with Turcotte looking over his shoulder at the pack, far behind, became famous.  Turcotte was North America's leading stakes-winning jockey in 1972 and 1973. He became the first jockey to win back-to-back Kentucky Derbies since Jimmy Winkfield in 1902 and was the first jockey to ever have won five of six consecutive Triple Crown races (matched in 2015 by Victor Espinoza).

He was voted the prestigious George Woolf Memorial Jockey Award that honors a rider whose career and personal conduct exemplifies the very best example of participants in the sport of thoroughbred racing. He is the first person from Thoroughbred racing ever to be appointed a member of the Order of Canada.

Turcotte's career ended July 13th, 1978. He fell from his horse, Flag of Leyte Gulf, during the 8th race at Belmont Park. He suffered injuries that resulted in his being a paraplegic.

He was inducted into the National Museum of Racing and Hall of Fame in 1979. He was voted into the New Brunswick Sports Hall of Fame and in 1980 was inducted into Canada's Sports Hall of Fame.

In 1984 he became the first ever recipient of the Avelino Gomez Memorial Award given annually to the jockey who is Canadian-born, Canadian-raised, or a regular in the country, who has made significant contributions to the sport.

In 2015, a statue of Secretariat and Turcotte crossing the finish line at the Belmont Stakes was unveiled in Turcotte's hometown of Grand Falls, New Brunswick.

Personal life
Born in Drummond, New Brunswick, Turcotte was one of 12 children. He left school at age 14 to work with his father as a lumberjack, then at age 18, headed to Toronto looking for construction work.

Turcotte now lives in his home town of Grand Falls, New Brunswick, Canada, with his wife Gaëtane and their four daughters. He is an advocate for those with disabilities and helps to raise funds for disability programs.

A well-known survivor of an on-track accident, Turcotte makes appearances at racetracks to raise funds and awareness of the assistance that the Permanently Disabled Jockeys Fund (PDJF) provides to fellow injured riders.

Turcotte was hospitalized on March 9, 2015, following a single-vehicle accident in New Brunswick. The van he was driving flipped after hitting a snowbank. Turcotte and a friend were both injured in the accident. Turcotte sustained fractures to both legs, while his friend suffered minor injuries.

Media
In the 2010 Disney movie Secretariat, Ron Turcotte's role as Secretariat's jockey is played by Otto Thorwarth, a real life jockey himself.

Directed by Phil Comeau, a National Film Board of Canada documentary feature film on Ron Turcotte's life and career, Secretariat's Jockey, Ron Turcotte, had its world premiere in Louisville, Kentucky in May 2013.

Notes

References
 Heller, Bill. The Will to Win: Ron Turcotte's Ride to Glory (1992) Fifth House Publishers 
 Ron Turcotte profile at Penny Chenery's Secretariat.com
 Ron Turcotte at the Canadian Horse Racing Hall of Fame
 Ron Turcotte at the United States ' National Museum of Racing and Hall of Fame

External links
 
 Secretariat's Jockey - Ron Turcotte at the National Film Board of Canada

1941 births
Living people
Canadian jockeys
Canadian Horse Racing Hall of Fame inductees
Avelino Gomez Memorial Award winners
American jockeys
Eclipse Award winners
United States Thoroughbred Racing Hall of Fame inductees
Members of the Order of Canada
Members of the Order of New Brunswick
Acadian people
Sportspeople from New Brunswick
New Brunswick Sports Hall of Fame inductees
People from Victoria County, New Brunswick
People with paraplegia
Canadian emigrants to the United States